William Henry Ashe à Court-Holmes later Holmes-à Court, 2nd Baron Heytesbury (11 July 1809 – 21 April 1891) was a British peer and Conservative Member of Parliament.

Career
Born William Henry Ashe à Court, Lord Heytesbury was the only son of William à Court, 1st Baron Heytesbury, and Maria Rebecca Bouverie. In 1828 he went up to St John's College, Cambridge. He was elected to the House of Commons for the Isle of Wight in 1837, a seat he held until 1847. In 1860 he succeeded his father as second Baron Heytesbury and entered the House of Lords.

Family
Lord Heytesbury married Elizabeth Holmes, daughter of Sir Leonard Thomas Worsley Holmes, 9th Baronet Worsley, in 1833. He assumed by Royal licence the additional surname of Holmes after that of à Court at the same time. In 1860 he changed the family name, by Royal Licence, from à Court-Holmes to Holmes-à Court. A daughter, Emily, married Edward O'Brien, 14th Baron Inchiquin. Lord Heytesbury died in April 1891, aged 81, and was succeeded by his grandson, William Holmes à Court.

References

Kidd, Charles, Williamson, David (editors). Debrett's Peerage and Baronetage (1990 edition). New York: St Martin's Press, 1990,

External links 
 

Heytesbury, William a Court-Holmes, 2nd Baron
Heytesbury, William a Court-Holmes, 2nd Baron
Alumni of St John's College, Cambridge
Heytesbury, William a Court-Holmes, 2nd Baron
Eldest sons of British hereditary barons
Holmes à Court family
Conservative Party (UK) MPs for English constituencies
UK MPs 1837–1841
UK MPs 1841–1847
UK MPs who inherited peerages
Members of Parliament for the Isle of Wight